Sumli is a small river originating from the Damra Hills of Boromura hill range in the Indian state of Tripura. It flows through the villages of Boiragi, Chakhuma, Yacharai, Kutna Kami and the town of Borokathal.

It has been the source of water for agricultural farming in the Sumli Valley and has been a small source of fishing for the local peoples.

See also
 Tripuri people

Rivers of Tripura
Rivers of India